Tillandsia fasciculata, commonly known as the giant airplant or cardinal airplant, is a species of bromeliad that is native to Central America, Mexico, the West Indies, northern South America (Venezuela, Colombia, Suriname, French Guiana, northern Brazil), and the southeastern United States (Georgia and Florida). Within the United States, this airplant is at risk of extirpation from the Mexican bromeliad weevil, Metamasius callizona.

Varieties and cultivars
Four varieties are recognized:

Tillandsia fasciculata var. clavispica Mez - Florida, Cuba, southern Mexico, Cayman Islands
Tillandsia fasciculata var. densispica Mez - Florida, southern and eastern Mexico, Guatemala, Costa Rica, Hispaniola
Tillandsia fasciculata var. fasciculata - most of species range
Tillandsia fasciculata var. laxispica Mez - central Mexico, Jamaica, Hispaniola, Cuba

Several cultivars have been named:
 Tillandsia 'Beauty'
 Tillandsia 'Casallena'
 Tillandsia 'Cathcart'
 Tillandsia 'Chevalieri'
 Tillandsia 'Chiquininga'
 Tillandsia 'Ervin Wurthmann'
 Tillandsia 'Florida'
 Tillandsia 'Hines Poth'
 Tillandsia 'Jalapa Fortin'
 Tillandsia 'Latas au Pair'
 Tillandsia 'Maria Teresa L.'
 Tillandsia 'Miz Ellen'
 Tillandsia 'Neerdie'
 Tillandsia 'Pachuca'
 Tillandsia 'Silver Bullets'
 Tillandsia 'Summer Dawn'
 Tillandsia 'Sybil Frasier'
 Tillandsia 'Tropiflora'
 Tillandsia 'Unamit'
 Tillandsia 'Verraco'
 Tillandsia 'Veteran'

References

fasciculata
Plants described in 1788
Flora of the Southeastern United States
Flora of Central America
Flora of Mexico
Flora of South America
Taxa named by Olof Swartz
Flora without expected TNC conservation status